Einstein is a German police procedural dramedy television series that is based on the 2015 film of the same name, written by Martin Ritzenhoff und Matthias Dinter.

The television series premiered on Sat.1 emotions on January 5, 2017 and has sold to over 100 territories including a hit in Spain and Portugal on AXN and also in Czech Republic on FilmBox.

On March 29, 2019, Sat.1 canceled the series after three seasons.

Plot
Felix Winterberg, unknown great-great-grandson of Albert Einstein, is the youngest professor of theoretical physics at Ruhr University Bochum. Winterberg has inherited the genius of Einstein and suffers from the deadly health of Huntington's Chorea, which gives him a remaining life expectancy of about seven years. 
He must help  Kriminalkommissarin (Police commissioner) Elena Lange as an independent consultant under the direction of Kriminaloberkommissar Stefan Tremmel in the investigation of murder cases in order not to end up in prison for violations of the Narcotics Act (unauthorized amphetamine).

Cast

Episodes

Season 1 (2017)

Season 2 (2018)

Season 3 (2019)

Reception

Ratings

Awards and nominations

Adaptations

American adaptation
In October 2018, an adaptation of the series at NBC was announced, with a creative team that includedwriter Michael Reisz, Carol Mendelsohn, and Tariq Jalil in association with Universal Television. That adaptation was not picked up, but in October 2020, another US adaptation was announced, this time for CBS.

Czech adaptation
In May 2021, an adaptation by Prima televize Einstein – Případy nesnesitelného génia starring Vojtěch Kotek started broadcasting.

Slovak adaptation
In February 2023, an adaptation by TV Joj Einstein starring Juraj Loj started broadcasting.

See also
List of German television series

References

German comedy-drama television series
German crime television series
2010s German police procedural television series
2017 German television series debuts
2019 German television series endings
German-language television shows
Sat.1 original programming